Slow Riot for New Zero Kanada, also stylized as Slow Riot for New Zerø Kanada, is the first and only EP and second release by Godspeed You! Black Emperor. It was released on the Montreal-based record label Constellation Records in 1999, and was re-released by Kranky.

Packaging
The EP's packaging makes only sparing reference to either the band or the EP's title: the outer packaging does not make any reference to Godspeed, but mentions them in the liner notes; the EP's title is only shown on the spine of the CD pressing. The song titles are not listed anywhere on the cover.

The cardboard album case is unusual in that it opens in the opposite direction of a conventional CD case; this is due to the Hebrew text being read from right to left.

The front of the EP contains Hebrew characters ,  ('formless and empty'). This phrase is used in both Genesis 1:2 and Jeremiah 4:23, the former to describe the Earth before God separated light from dark and the latter to describe the Earth after the Lord's Day. The dots and dashes above the letters are called trope. They dictate the tune and intonation and are found in the Torah as well as the rest of the Hebrew Bible. On the inside cover, this text is put into greater context, with Jer 4:23–27 provided in both Hebrew and English (seemingly the Jewish Publication Society version):

23 I beheld the earth,
And, lo, it was waste and void;
And the heavens, and they had no light.
24 I beheld the mountains, and, lo, they trembled,
And all the hills moved to and fro.
25 I beheld, and, lo, there was no man,
And all the birds of the heavens were fled.
26 I beheld, and, lo, the fruitful field was a wilderness,
And all the cities thereof were broken down
And before His fierce anger.
27 For thus saith the :
The whole land shall be desolate;
Yet will I not make a full end.

The back of the EP contains a diagram with instructions in Italian on how to make a molotov cocktail.

The EP is pressed on a 12" record with each side intended to be played at a different speed. Side A, "Moya", is played at 45 rpm, while side B, "BBF3", is played at 33 ⅓ rpm.

Songs

Moya
The song title is a reference to band member Mike Moya. Concert setlists refer to this song as "Gorecki" because it is a reworking of his third symphony.

BBF3
The song title "BBF3" refers to the vox pop interviewee going by the name of "Blaise Bailey Finnegan III", whose eccentric ramblings form the core of the song. Finnegan recites a poem which he claims to have written himself. The poem is, in fact, mostly composed of lyrics from the song "Virus" by Iron Maiden that were written by their then-vocalist Blaze Bayley. Blaise Bailey Finnegan III is also heard interviewed at the beginning of the track "Providence" on the group's previous release F♯ A♯ ∞, and indeed some concert performances of "BBF3" also incorporate that sample.

Reception
, it is the highest-rated EP of all time on Rate Your Music.

Track listing

Personnel

Godspeed You! Black Emperor
Thierry Amar – bass guitar, double bass
David Bryant – guitar, tapes
Bruce Cawdron – drums, percussion, glockenspiel
Aidan Girt – drums, percussion
Norsola Johnson – cello
Efrim Menuck – guitar, keyboards
Mike Moya – guitar
Mauro Pezzente – bass guitar
Sophie Trudeau – violin

Technical personnel
 Dale Morningstar – recording and mixing

References

External links
Constellation's Information Page on Slow Riot for New Zerø Kanada

1999 EPs
Godspeed You! Black Emperor albums
Instrumental rock EPs
Constellation Records (Canada) EPs
Kranky EPs